Jakarta Special Capital Region II, abbreviated as DKI Jakarta II, is an electoral district in Indonesia which encompasses of Central and South Jakarta in the Jakarta Special Capital Region. The district also represents Indonesian constituents abroad. Since 2009, this district has been represented by seven members of People's Representative Council (DPR RI).

Components 
 2004–2009: West Jakarta and South Jakarta
 2009–present: Redistricted into Central Jakarta, South Jakarta, dan overseas electorates

List of members 
The following list is in alphabetical order. Party with the largest number of members is placed on top of the list.

Notes

See also 
 List of Indonesian national electoral districts

Reference

External Links 
 (Indonesian) Daftar Anggota Dewan Perwakilan Rakyat Republik Indonesia Daerah Pemilihan DKI Jakarta II 2019–2024

Electoral districts of Indonesia